Corixidea is a genus of jumping soil bugs in the family Schizopteridae. There are at least three described species in Corixidea.

Species
These three species belong to the genus Corixidea:
 Corixidea crassa McAtee & Malloch
 Corixidea lunigera (Reuter, 1891)
 Corixidea major Mcatee & Malloch, 1925

References

Further reading

 

Schizopteridae
Heteroptera genera
Articles created by Qbugbot